Alltel Pavilion may refer to:
 Alltel Pavilion (Raleigh, North Carolina), former name of an amphitheatre in Raleigh, North Carolina
 Alltel Pavilion at the Siegel Center, a multi-purpose facility on the campus of Virginia Commonwealth University in Richmond, Virginia